Eleanor and Franklin: The Story of Their Relationship, Based on Eleanor Roosevelt's Private Papers  is a 1971 biography of Eleanor Roosevelt written by Joseph P. Lash. Its companion volume, Eleanor: The Years Alone (1972), covers her life as a widow after Franklin D. Roosevelt's death.

The biography won the 1972 Pulitzer Prize for Biography.

References

Bibliography 

 
 
 
 
 https://archive.org/details/bookreviewdigest1971unse/page/792/mode/1up
 BRD 1972, p. 763

External links 

 Full text at the Internet Archive

1971 non-fiction books
English-language books
W. W. Norton & Company books
Eleanor Roosevelt
Biographies of Franklin D. Roosevelt